Herfkens is a surname. Notable people with the surname include:

Annette Herfkens, Vietnam Airlines Flight 474 survivor
Eveline Herfkens (born 1952), Dutch politician